Peter VI the Lame (1534 – 1 July 1594) was Prince of Moldavia from June 1574 to 23 November 1577. He also ruled 1 January 1578 to 21 November 1579 and 17 October 1583 to 29 August 1591. He was known as "the Lame" due to a physical deformity. Raised by the Turks in Istanbul and hardly knew of his country of origin before gaining the throne of Moldavia.

Voivode of Moldavia 
Anxious to rule like his brother Alexandru II Mircea, Petru was elected prince of Moldavia in 1574. However, unlike most of his ancestors, he was a weak prince and eventually gave up the throne in order to live comfortably in the west.

Family life 
His first marriage to Maria Amirali was arranged in childhood, and failed. Petru soon fell in love with a Roma named Irina who became his mistress since marriage to a Roma was impossible. He had Irina freed from slavery and baptized, hence her nickname "Botezata" (the Baptized). After he gave up the throne, together they moved to the city of Bolzano in present-day Italy's Tyrol. Sadly for Irina, Peter fell in love with a seductive Circassian named Maria, a lady-in-waiting at his mini-court.  Irina died at 25 and was buried in a small cemetery in Bolzano. Their son Ștefăniță never ruled in Moldavia. He was raised as a Catholic and placed in a Jesuit seminary in Innsbruck. He was known to be an obedient student, but died of tuberculosis in 1602. He is buried beside his parents in Bolzano.

Death 
Two years after the death of Irina, Peter died of syphilis. He is laid to rest beside her and on his tombstone is the inscription: "I, Prince Peter, descendant of the royal Corvinus family of Wallachia...who abandoned the throne of my own will, having obtained asylum from the House of Austria, [breathed my last] on July 1, 1594."

References

Rulers of Moldavia
1594 deaths
House of Drăculești
Year of birth unknown
Royalty and nobility with disabilities
Deaths from syphilis